The 1999 New Zealand gallantry awards were announced via a special honours list on 23 October 1999, and recognised one member of the New Zealand Defence Force for actions during United Nations peacekeeping operations in Cambodia in 1992.

New Zealand Gallantry Decoration (NZGD)
 Chief Petty Officer Writer John Clinton Lionel Oxenham – of Lower Hutt; Royal New Zealand Navy (Retired).

References

Gallantry awards
New Zealand gallantry awards